Aladdin Schirmer (born 31 December 1992) is an American professional rugby union player. He played as a flanker or No.8 for the Seattle Seawolves and the Colorado Raptors in Major League Rugby (MLR).

He also played for the USA Eagles internationally.

References

1992 births
Living people
American rugby union players
Seattle Seawolves players
United States international rugby union players
Rugby union locks
Rugby union flankers
Rugby union number eights
American Raptors players